The 80th Training Command (The Army School System - TASS) is a formation of the United States Army Reserve.

The unit was first organized in August 1917 and activated the following September during World War I as the 80th Division. During World War II, the Division was redesignated on 1 August 1942, as the 80th Infantry Division.  Nicknamed the "Blue Ridge Division", it was initially composed of draftees from the mid-atlantic states of Maryland, Pennsylvania, Virginia, and West Virginia. The Division was redesignated the 80th Airborne Division from December 1946 to May 1952. In May 1952 and March 1959, the unit was redesignated as a reserve infantry division and then a reserve training division. In 1994, the unit was granted the designation, 80th Division (Institutional Training). On 1 October 2008, the unit underwent a major transformation and is now the 80th Training Command.

World War I

Activated: September 1917
Overseas: June 1918
Major operations: Battle of the Somme (1918), Meuse-Argonne, Battle of Saint-Mihiel.
Casualties: Total-6,029. (KIA-880; WIA-5,149).
Commanders: Brig. Gen. Herman Hall (27 August 1917), Maj. Gen. Adelbert Cronkhite (9 September 1917), Brig. Gen. L. M. Brett (26 November 1917), Brig. Gen. W. P. Richardson (28 December 1917), Brig. Gen. Charles S. Farnsworth (7 January 1918), Brig. Gen. L. M. Brett (14 January 1918), Maj. Gen. Adelbert Cronkhite (1 March 1918), Maj. Gen. S. D. Sturgis (22 November 1918).
Inactivated: May 1919.

History
Because of significant common heritage in the past (Indian War, Revolutionary War and Civil War), residents of Pennsylvania, Virginia and West Virginia became the structure of the 80th Division.
The 80th Division was organized in August 1917 at Camp Lee, Virginia. The units were made up mostly of men from the above three states.

Order of battle

 Headquarters, 80th Division
 159th Infantry Brigade
 317th Infantry Regiment
 318th Infantry Regiment
 313th Machine Gun Battalion
 160th Infantry Brigade
 319th Infantry Regiment
 320th Infantry Regiment
 315th Machine Gun Battalion
 155th Field Artillery Brigade
 313th Field Artillery Regiment (75 mm)
 314th Field Artillery Regiment (75 mm)
 315th Field Artillery Regiment (155 mm)
 305th Trench Mortar Battery
 314th Machine Gun Battalion
 305th Engineer Regiment
 305th Field Signal Battalion
 Headquarters Troop, 80th Division
 305th Train Headquarters and Military Police
 305th Ammunition Train
 305th Supply Train
 305th Engineer Train
 305th Sanitary Train
 317th, 318th, 319th, and 320th Ambulance Companies and Field Hospitals

The 317th Infantry included men from central and western Virginia; the 318th Infantry was made up mostly of men from the Shenandoah Valley and Tidewater areas; the 313th Machine Gun Battalion mostly had men from the Erie, Pennsylvania, area. These units comprised the 159th Infantry Brigade. The 318th Infantry were nicknamed the "squirrels" while training with the British in the Artois/Picardy section of France; the 1st Battalion was the "red squirrels," the 2nd Battalion was the "gray squirrels," and the 3rd Battalion was the "flying squirrels."

The 319th Infantry included men from the Allegheny County and Erie areas, and a few from eastern Ohio. The 320th Infantry had men from Pittsburgh; the 315th Machine Gun Battalion had men from Pittsburgh and Erie. These units combined to create the 160th Infantry Brigade.

Each infantry regiment in the 80th Division used a unique helmet marking; the 317th used a diamond, the 318th a square, the 319th a circle, and the 320th Infantry Regiment a bowl shape. The headquarters of each regiment divided their shape using three vertical stripes of red, white, and blue; the 1st battalion of each regiment used solid red, the 2nd battalion white, and the 3rd battalion blue. Each company painted their respective letter inside the shape. The machine gun company of each regiment divided their shape vertically in half in red and blue; the supply company divided their shape in red and white.

The 313th, 314th and 315th Field Artillery Regiments were composed of men almost exclusively from the state of West Virginia, and formed the 155th Field Artillery Brigade.

Serving with the division were the 314th Machine Gun Battalion (men from the Tidewater area) as well as the 305th Engineer Regiment (men from the area east and north of Pittsburgh); the 305th Trains (Ammunition, Engineer, Supply and Sanitary) were men from western Pennsylvania, West Virginia and Virginia. The engineers were more often than not sent out ahead. During the rest period from 14 October through the Armistice, they finally were outfitted with U.S. Springfield and Browning automatic rifles. They had two weeks to train before the third and final push began in the Meuse-Argonne. It was also during this period that an attack formation was reorganized to allow for more maneuverability.

Meuse-Argonne

The 155th Field Artillery Regiment was in combat from the start of the Meuse Argonne, continuously with the 80th Division, but served also with the 90th Division into Germany, until after the Armistice. Altogether, the 155th served with five different divisions.

During the Meuse Argonne campaign, the 80th Division was the only one that saw action during each phase of the offensive (three times). And they first earned their motto, "The 80th Division Moves only Forward!". The artillery of the division boasted more days of continuous combat firing than the batteries of any other American division. The 80th captured two Germans and one machine gun for every man wounded and one piece of artillery with gun crew for every 10 men wounded. Men of the 80th Division received 619 awards and decorations.

Helmet insignias
"Previously announced, the distinctive symbols of the various units of the Division were declared official on 30 April 1918. For the four Infantry Regiments, in their order beginning with the 317th Infantry, they were a diamond, square, circle, and semi circle. The symbol of each unit's Headquarters Company was colored red, white and blue; that of the Supply Company red and white; that of the Machine Gun Company red and blue. The battalion symbols were colored in red (Coys, A, B, C, D), white (Coys, E, F, G, H), blue (Coys, I, K, L, M) in numerical order. The three Machine Gun battalions were identified with a shield - blue and white (313th), red and white (314th), red and blue (315th), in order, beginning with the 313th M.G.Bn. Other Units of the Command were assigned equally distinctive symbols, thereby enabling property and individuals immediately identified by the markings required on the packing cases, wagons, helmets and other property articles".

All artillery units wear the "Gun Sight" on their helmets. It referenced the 313th F.A. and 314th F.A. with two blocks at approximately 45 degrees and 270 degrees. The 315th F.A. was 155mm and their "Gun Sight" emblem was a variation of this emblem. It contained the infantry colors (blue) in the four quadrants. In the center, there was a star and the battery letter was in the center of the star. The engineer units were identified by spades on their helmets. White and red for the headquarters company, red for the 1st Battalion (Companies A,B,C), white for the 2nd Battalion (Companies D, E, F).

Interwar period

The division was reconstituted in the Organized Reserve on 24 June 1921 and assigned to the states of Virginia and Maryland, and the District of Columbia. The headquarters was organized on 1 September 1921.

World War II

Ordered into active military service: 15 July 1942; Initially, soldiers reported to Camp Forrest, Tennessee, named for General Nathan Bedford Forrest, a Confederate Cavalry commander in the Civil War. The Division later moved for training at Camp Phillips, near Salina, Kansas and at Camp Iron Mountain and Camp Laguna at the Desert Training Center in the California - Arizona Maneuver Area (DTC / C-AMA).  The 80th Division, as part of MG Alexander M. Patch Jr.'s IV Corps, were stationed at Camp Laguna, AZ about 25 miles North of Yuma AZ. The 80th remained at the DTC / C-AMA from December 1943 to March 1944.
Overseas: 1 July 1944
Campaigns: Northern France, Rhineland, Ardennes-Alsace, Central Europe
Days of combat: 239
Distinguished Unit Citations: 6
Awards: Medal of Honor-4; Distinguished Service Cross (United States)-34; Distinguished Service Medal (United States)-1; Silver Star-771; LM-12; DFC-5; SM-35; BSM-3,869, AM-123.
Commanders: Maj. Gen. Joseph D. Patch (July 1942 – March 1943), Maj. Gen. Horace L. McBride (March 1943 – October 1945), Maj. Gen. Walter E. Lauer (October 1945 – December 1945).
Returned to U.S.: 3 January 1946.
Inactivated: 5 January 1946.

Order of battle

 Headquarters, 80th Infantry Division
 317th Infantry Regiment
 318th Infantry Regiment
 319th Infantry Regiment
 Headquarters and Headquarters Battery, 80th Infantry Division Artillery
313th Field Artillery Battalion (105 mm)
314th Field Artillery Battalion (105 mm)
315th Field Artillery Battalion (155 mm)
905th Field Artillery Battalion (105 mm)
 305th Engineer Combat Battalion
 305th Medical Battalion
 80th Cavalry Reconnaissance Troop (Mechanized)
 Headquarters, Special Troops, 80th Infantry Division
 Headquarters Company, 80th Infantry Division
 780th Ordnance Light Maintenance Company
 80th Quartermaster Company
 80th Signal Company
 Military Police Platoon
 Band
 80th Counterintelligence Corps Detachment

Combat chronicle
On 5 August 1944, the 80th landed at Utah Beach. The division was destined to become the "work horse" of General Patton's Third Army and to play a key role in the breakthrough at Avranches. The Division then attacked Argentan, taking it, 20 August, and creating the Falaise Pocket. After mopping up in the area, the 80th took part in the Third Army dash across France, cutting through Saint-Mihiel, Châlons, and Commercy in pursuit of the retreating Germans until stopped by the lack of gasoline and other supplies at the river Seille.

From 25 September to 7 November, the division maintained an aggressive defense of positions west of the Seille, and prepared for the Third Army sweep into the industrially vital Saar Basin. The attack jumped off on 8 November, the 80th advancing through Delme Ridge, Faulquemont, and St. Avold to within  of Saarbrücken, when it was relieved by the 6th Armored Division, 7 December 1944.

Battle of the Bulge
After 10 days rest, the division returned to combat, moving southeast to take part in an attack on the Siegfried Line at Zweibrücken when the Germans launched their winter offensive in the Ardennes. The 80th was moved northward to Luxembourg and was hurled against the German salient, fighting at Luxembourg and Bastogne. By Christmas Day, men of the 80th were side by side with the tanks of the 4th Armored Division, battering forward through murderous opposition to help the 101st Airborne Division, besieged in Bastogne. Over frozen, snow-covered terrain, the attack gained nine bitter miles despite constant machine gun and mortar fire. The next day, the gap between the rescuers and the besieged was narrowed to 4000 yards. On 28 December, the 80th broke through, bringing relief to the 101st before driving the enemy across the Sure to Dahl and Goesdorf, 7 January 1945, and across the Clerf and Wiltz Rivers by 23 January. On 7 February 1945, the division stormed across the Our and Sauer Rivers at Wallendorf (Eifel), broke through the Siegfried Line, pursued the fleeing enemy to Kaiserslautern, 20 March, and crossed the Rhine, 27–28 March, near Mainz.

Pursuit continued in April, the division defeating the German defenders at Kassel, driving rapidly to Erfurt on the 12th, and Weimar, Jena, and Gera on the 14th. Relieved, 21 April, it moved to Nürnberg for occupation duty and on 28 April, to Regensburg, then to the Enns River, battling to the very end. It has been alleged that the last shot fired on the western front was in Czechoslovakia by the 80th, the last of General Patton's divisions still in action. General Patton issued his cease-fire order at 0800 on 8 May 1945. By V-E day, the 80th Division had amassed 289 days of combat and had captured more than 200,000 enemy soldiers.

Casualties
Total battle casualties: 17,087
Killed in action: 3,038
Wounded in action: 12,484
Missing in action: 488
Prisoner of war: 1,077

Assignments in European Theatre of Operations
1 August 1944: XII Corps, Third Army, 12th Army Group.
7 August 1944: XX Corps
8 August 1944: XV Corps.
10 August 1944: XX Corps.
17 August 1944: Third Army, 12th Army Group, but attached to the V Corps, First Army, 12th Army Group.
28 August 1944: Third Army, 12th Army Group.
26 August 1944: XII Corps.
19 December 1944: III Corps.
26 December 1944: XII Corps.
10 March 1945: XX Corps.

Cold War
The division was inactivated in January 1946, but reactivated in December of that year as the 80th Airborne Division. Since then, the division has been reorganized several times. As an airborne division, it became one of 24 organized Reserve Corps divisions. In 1952, during the Korean War, it was reorganized again as the 80th Infantry Division and remained as such for seven years. In March 1959, it was reorganized as the 80th Division (Training), with a primary focus of providing initial entry training to trainees at Fort Bragg, North Carolina, and Fort Jackson, South Carolina, a mission and structure that lasted for many years. In 1988 and 1990, the division carried out ten-week exercises for wartime mobilization missions named, "Old Dominion Forward" at Fort Bragg, setting up training for nearly 700 new Soldiers.

Persian Gulf War
Units from the 80th Division were activated in support of Operations Desert Shield and Desert Storm. Two 80th Division units were called to active duty in support of Operation Desert Shield/Storm. The 424th Transportation Company of Galax, Virginia, was activated 17 November 1990. After training and equipping at Fort Eustis, Virginia, it deployed to Saudi Arabia 5 January 1991. For its service in the war the company was awarded a Meritorious Unit Commendation. Citation reading: "... under adverse conditions in a combat zone, logging over 850,000 accident- free road miles, in the countries of Saudi Arabia, Kuwait and Iraq." By the end of the war, elements of the 424th had advanced as far as the Euphrates River in support of coalition assault units. The 424th returned to the United States on 29–30 June 1991, and to home station 3 July. Soldiers of the 3rd Battalion, 318th Regiment, 4th Brigade, at Fort Story, Virginia, were activated 23 January 1991, and reported to Fort Eustis to train recalled reservists. Because of the short duration of the ground war in Iraq and Kuwait, additional Individual Ready Reserve troops were not called up and the 3rd Battalion was released from active duty and returned to home station 17 March.

New training reorganization
In 1992, the division began a training base expansion mission at Fort Benning, Georgia. The mission changed to professional roundout training at Fort Jackson, South Carolina, the following year when Reservists worked with active duty Army drill sergeants in training new soldiers. October 1994 marked the fourth major reorganization since World War II, when it became Headquarters, 80th Division (Training). Maintaining the Initial Entry mission, it expanded to provide "The Army School System" or TASS mission. The 80th took command and control of 10 Army Reserve Forces schools, and along with legacy divisions from World War II (84th, 95th, 98th, 100th, 104th, and the 108th) became one of seven institutional training (IT) divisions, located in seven regions throughout the U.S. The 80th Division (IT) provided instructions for units in Region B which included Virginia, West Virginia, Pennsylvania, Maryland, the District of Columbia, and Delaware. Seven brigades of the 80th Division (IT) carried out specific training missions in the above states and proceeded to Fort Leonard Wood, Missouri, to support expansion of the U.S. Army Training Center and to conduct Basic Combat Training (BCT), One Station Unit Training (OSUT) and other specialized training, as directed by Training and Doctrine Command (TRADOC).

Global War on Terrorism
Operation Noble Eagle After 11 September 2001, specialized training commenced with drill sergeant and instructor units mobilized to training posts in the U.S.
Operation Enduring Freedom in 2004, 80th Division (IT) units provided training and reconstruction support to the Afghanistan government.
Operation Iraqi Freedom in 2005 in support, the 80th Division (IT) mobilized and deployed to Iraq in support of the largest activation of the division's soldiers since World War II, serving in every specialty and skill as a part of the Multi-National Security Transition Command-Iraq. Two soldiers were killed in action and two others died stateside while mobilized during this conflict.

During the period 17 May 2005 to 15 August 2006, 80th Division (Institutional Training) displayed outstanding meritorious service in support of Operation Iraqi Freedom.  The unit planned and executed the largest mobilization and combat-zone deployment of the Army Reserve Division since 1945.  Additionally, the unit was responsible for training and advising over 106,000 Iraqi Army Soldiers to include: two Iraqi Army Division Headquarters, seven Iraqi Brigade Headquarters, and twenty-two Battalions of Iraqi Soldiers.

So far 80th Division soldiers have earned more than 1,144 medals and citations including 31 Purple Hearts, 2 Bronze Stars with Combat V, 467 Bronze Stars, 84 Combat Infantryman Badges (CIB) and 187 Combat Action Badges (CAB). The unit continues to support the Global War on Terrorism with individual and group deployments to the theater of operations as required.

80th Training Command
On 1 October 2008, the 80th Division (IT) transformed to become the 80th Training Command (TASS). It expanded from the five states to reach across the entire country. Of the seven IT divisions, only three remain, with the 80th taking command of the entire TASS mission for the Army Reserve. The 80th expanded from eight brigades and 12 battalions to three divisions (94th, 100th, 102nd), 13 brigades, 63 battalions, and 14 training centers. The 80th is the third-largest command organization in the U.S. Army Reserve. Made up of over 7,300 Army Reserve Soldiers assigned to 15 brigade units aligned under three major subordinate one-star commands with units located nationwide—from Pennsylvania to Puerto Rico and from the Carolinas and Georgia to California. It has an operational control training relationship with a unit in Hawaii and a support relationship with a unit in Germany.

The command's annual economic impact is about $40–60 million. In addition to the salaries of full-time civilian and military personnel, this figure also includes pay to Army Reserve soldiers, money spent locally for the purchase of supplies, services, maintenance support, equipment, facility construction and renovation, and the G.I. Bill college tuition payments to Army Reserve soldiers attending school.

The 80th trains Army soldiers in the career military fields for Combat Support and Combat Service Support. The 94th Training Division (Force Sustainment) headquarters is located at Fort Lee, Virginia, and became fully mission capable in October 2009. The 100th Training Division (Operational Support) has its headquarters in Louisville. Kentucky, and will soon relocate to Fort Knox. The 102nd Training Division (Maneuver Support) headquarters is located at Fort Leonard Wood, Missouri, and also became fully mission capable in October 2009.

Commanders
World War I
Major General Adelbert Cronkhite
Brigadier General Lloyd Milton Brett
Major General Samuel D. Sturgis

World War II
Major General Walter E. Lauer
Major General Joseph D. Patch
Major General Horace L. McBride

Cold War
Major General James B. Cress
Major General William M. Stokes, Jr.
Major General Morgan M. Wallace
Major General Frederick H. Garber III
Brigadier General Charles B. Deane
Major General Willard P. Milby, Jr.
Major General Louis H. Ginn
Major General John P. Henderson
Major General John W. Knapp

Persian Gulf War
Major General Stephen H. Sewell, Jr.

__

Major General Max Guggenheimer, Jr.
Major General James P. Browder, Jr.

Global War on Terrorism
Major General Douglas O. Dollar
Major General David L. Evans
Major General John P. McLaren, Jr.

General information
Nickname: Blue Ridge. Thundering Herd
Slogan: Only moves forward. (Original slogan: Strength of the mountains.)
Shoulder patch: Whitebordered shield of green upon which are superimposed three azure blue mountain peaks.

References

Notes

Sources
The Army Almanac: A Book of Facts Concerning the Army of the United States U.S. Government Printing Office, 1950 reproduced at CMH.
European Theater of Operations, United States. Army. "Forward 80th: The Story of the 80Th Infantry Division." Desfossés-néogravure, 1945. Print.
Parker, Danny S. Battle of the Bulge: Hitler's Ardennes Offensive, 1944–1945. Philadelphia: Combined, 1991. Print.
Hopkins, Michael F., and Michael L. Dockrill. The Cold War. 2nd ed. Basingstoke: PALGRAVE MACMILLAN, 2006. Print.
318th Infantry, United States. Army. History of the 318th Infantry Regiment of the 80th Division, 1917–1919. Richmond: William Byrd, 1919. Print.
Craighill, Edley. History of the 317th Infantry. Tours: Imprimerie Deslis Frères Et Cie, 1919. Print.

External links

 80th Division, Summary of Operations in the World War. American Battle Monuments Commission, 1944.
http://www.80thdivision.com
http://www.usmilitariaforum.com/forums/index.php?/topic/176-80th-infantry-division-80th-airborne-division/Forward 80th: The Story of the 80th Infantry Division
The 80th Division in World War Two
GlobalSecurity: 80th Division
80th Infantry Division Lineage, United States Army Center of Military History.
Documents of the 80th Infantry Division, United States Army Center of Military History

080th Infantry Division, U.S.
Military units and formations established in 1917
Infantry Division, U.S. 080
United States Army divisions of World War I
Training divisions of the United States Army
Infantry divisions of the United States Army in World War II